Greenough is an unincorporated community located in Mitchell County, Georgia, United States. It lies at the intersection of GA 112, Stage Coach, Tuton and Greenough roads. Palm Road also is in the area.

Geography
Greenough's latitude is at 31.317 and its longitude is at -84.102. Greenough appears on the Sale City U.S. Geological Survey Map.

References

Unincorporated communities in Mitchell County, Georgia
Unincorporated communities in Georgia (U.S. state)